Out and back refers to the layout of a roller coaster.  An out and back coaster is one that climbs a lift hill soon after leaving the station, races out to the far end of the track after the initial drop, performs a 180 degree turn and then returns to the station. Some out and back coasters perform more complicated turns at the far end of the track.

This particular design is very popular and is easy to design and construct.  With an out and back design, the hills on the way "out" usually are quite large and gradually decrease in size.  The hills on the way "back" are usually "bunny hops", or small hills created to maximize air-time.

Design variants
The simplest out-and-back layout resembles a flattened oval when viewed from above. In profile, the train leaves the station (point A) and ascends the lift hill; after gaining kinetic energy from the initial drop, the train ascends a second hill to slow the train before it enters the first turn-back at the far end of the track (point B). Exiting the turn-back, the train descends the second hill to gain speed again before entering a third hill (or a braking area) to slow for a second turn-back at the near end of the track (point C) and the return to the station.

Double out-and-back

A variation on the theme has the track traveling from the station (point A) out to the far end (point B), then returning past the station before traveling out to the far end again, and finally returning to the station. From above, the simplest double out-and-back would appear as a flattened oval spiral with a crossover for the final return to the station.

Examples of this type of ride include the venerable Comet, which was moved from Crystal Beach Park in Ontario to Great Escape at Queensbury, New York, the Phoenix at Knoebels' Amusement Resort in Elysburg, Pennsylvania, and GhostRider at Knott’s Berry Farm in Buena Park, California.

Triple out-and-back
These coasters travel back and forth between A and B thrice; the resulting appearance is often hard to discern from true twisters, which are usually free-form in design.  An example of this type of ride is the Coney Island Cyclone.

Quadruple out-and-back and higher
While no roller coasters of this type are known, they would travel between A and B more than three times. Like triple out-and-backs, they are hard to discern from twisters, and sometimes wild mice.

Examples

 
Types of roller coaster